Lycée International de Londres Winston Churchill, a fully bilingual international school based in Wembley, London, England, opened its doors in September 2015.  It welcomes students from 3 to 18 years old and prepares them for the French Baccalauréat, the Baccalauréat with OIB (Option Internationale du Baccalauréat) and the International Baccalaureate Diploma programme (IBDP).

The school offers a unique setup for the new Early Years programme to children entering pre-reception and reception years (3 to 5 years old) from September 2020 by teaching conjointly French and English by two native-speaker teachers present at all times.

Registered Charity No 1160719, The Lycée International de Londres Winston Churchill occupies the former Brent Town Hall, a conversion of a Grade II listed building.

History 

The Lycée International of Londres Winston Churchill is an independent school founded by the French Education Charitable Trust in 2015. It joins the growing worldwide network of the Agency for French Education Abroad (AEFE), a government agency overseen by the French Ministry of Foreign Affairs and International Development.

It was named Lycée International de Londres Winston Churchill on Saturday 24 January to coincide with the 50th anniversary of the former British Prime Minister's death, on 24 January 1965. The Lycée International de Londres Winston Churchill opened its doors to its first group of students in September 2015. {{

In a ceremony attended by French President François Hollande, the Lycée International de Londres Winston Churchill was inaugurated in September 2015. 

In June 2018, the first graduating class took the French Baccalaureate. This followed the school recording strong admission statistics, with 92% of applicants to the UK gaining admission to a Russell Group university.

Program

Curriculum 
The French national curriculum provides the core of a bilingual international programme along with the Early Years programme for children entering pre-reception and reception years. Their students have the opportunity to sit for the French Baccalauréat, with or without the International Option (Option Internationale du Baccalauréat - OIB). The Lycée International de Londres Winston Churchill is also now an International Baccalaureate World School and offers an English International Programme starting from Year 7.

The school offers a unique setup for their new Early Years programme  to children entering pre-reception and reception years (3 to 5 years old) from September 2020 by teaching conjointly French and English by two native-speaker teachers present at all times.

Following a visit by inspectors of the International Baccalauréate Organization, the Lycée International Winston Churchill is the first French international school in the UK to have been authorised as an IB World School. It offers students the International Baccalaureate Diploma programme (IBDP) to Year 12 and 13. In 2018, the school launched its English International Programme for English-speaking students in Years 7 to 11; a tailored curriculum based on a model of inquiry and concept-based learning. In Year 11, students also have the opportunity to take the English Language and Literature IGCSEs.

The school has diverse ethnic groups within its staff and students. The school cares for 900 pupils from 45 nationalities and staff from 16 different nationalities.

Service learning, Duke of Edinburgh Awards and linguistic trips 
The Lycée organises Service Learning trips to Laos and Nepal for Première/Year 12 students.

To complement compulsory study of German, Spanish or Mandarin as a foreign language, the school organises trips overseas. Travelling to Guatemala and China has allowed students to further their linguistic prowess and their understanding of local culture.

The Lycée also has a LIL After School Programme combined with the Duke Of Edinburgh's Award to add coherence and opportunity to their students’ non academic program. This award has three different levels, each one more challenging than the other; the bronze award, silver award, and gold award. The participants have to complete four requirements depending on their level; 3, 6 or 12 months of a physical activity, 3, 6, or 12 months of volunteering for an association, 3, 6 or 12 months of enhancing a skill, and a walking expedition which will last two days and one night, three days and two nights, and four days and three nights, each requirement set with a personal goal.

The school students are global citizens. They participate in international competitions and conferences that expand their horizons and hone their appreciation of the complex diversity of the world: Model UN, UNIS-UN, César des Lycéens, Mathquest and Astro pi challenge.

After school program and discovery classes 
The Lycée International de Londres Winston Churchill offers over 30 after-school programs providing fun, diverse and educating activities, including molecular gastronomy, coding and many more. In addition to the discovery classes, the school also offers a wide range of sports including rugby, handball, hockey, basketball, football, boxing, yoga, badminton, laser run, fencing, and many more. Child supervision (Garderie) is also available to Primary families.

Student life 

Lycée students have quickly created student life in this school through numerous initiatives. These include the set-up of a student café, known endearingly as "La Cafet", which sells locally produced French pastries and serves hot/cold drinks. Students have also launched clubs like a Debate Society and an Art Society.

The Emotional Wellbeing department runs the "Peer Counsellor" programme, where Secondary students train for an emotional wellbeing certificate. Furthermore, Secondary students can apply for a "Peer Tutoring" program in which they will be assigned a younger student with certain difficulties in a subject, that they will help. Finally, students can also apply to be library assistants to help the librarian cover books, catalog them, put them away, and participate in the Library's day-to-day life.

Campus 

The Lycée International de Londres Winston Churchill occupies the site of the former Brent Town Hall. The campus is set over five acres, with 12,000 square metres housing the three levels of schooling. It boasts multiple onsite sports facilities including a running track, three outdoor sports pitches and an indoor gymnasium. The new Annex building houses modern science classrooms and a large, bright dining area. The former town hall building has been fully remodelled and modernised, while conserving its unique character.

In 2015, the catering partner of the school, Holroyd Howe, won the "Education Caterer of the Year" award, organized by the Foodservice Cateys. It has since then decreased badly. Seriously it's harder to fail making  pasta than to succeed and somehow they manage it.

Uniform 

The Lycée International de Londres is the only of the 3 major French-British educational establishments in London to have a uniform. The dress code consists of a white polo, blouse or shirt, navy pants, black shoes and a bordeaux, light blue, green or orange sweater. This policy was established to create a more cohesive and recognisable student body. It was also felt that a uniform would be more egalitarian. A sports uniform was also put in place, the students wear navy blue tracksuit bottoms or leggings as well as a sports shirt with the school logo and a bordeaux sweatshirt with the school logo. This decision has caused many conflicts between students, from the French system used to more freedom, and the school's personel. One can understand that considering the atrocity they make them wear.

Involvement 
The Lycée International de Londres Winston Churchill was invited to become a member of the Council of International Schools (CIS) following a visit by inspectors. The school is also a Common Sense School, committed to deep implementation of the Common Sense Digital Citizenship Curriculum and its dedication to helping students think critically and use technology responsibly to learn, create, and participate.

Ofsted report 
Following a visit by inspectors from the Office for Standards in Education, Children's Services and Skills, Lycee International Winston Churchill became the only French international school in the UK to have an "Outstanding" rating for sixth form provision (16 – 19 years old). Overall, the school's rating was ‘Good Provider’.

References

External links 
 
Lycée International de Londres Winston Churchill 
AEFE
Council of International Schools
International Baccalaureate
Common Sense Schools

2015 establishments in England
French international schools in the United Kingdom
Educational institutions established in 2015
Private co-educational schools in London
Private schools in the London Borough of Brent
Wembley